Dedicated 2 the Oldies 2 is the tenth double disc studio album from rapper Mr. Capone-E released in 2007. The album features WC (rapper), Fingazz, Joe Bataan and the rest of the Hi Power Soldiers.

Track listing

Disc 1
Dedicated Intro 2:10
West, West, West (featuring WC/Stomper) 3:31
Summertime Anthem (featuring Fingazz) 4:39
Game 4:16
Trippen 3:01
Pimp (Skit) 1:24
Never Seen a Pimp Like Me 3:33
Wet Dreams 3:09
In the House (featuring Mr. Criminal/Elite 1) 4:02
Spreading Worldwide (featuring Mr. Criminal/Stomper/Mr. Silent) 4:33
Answering Machine (Skit) 2:43
Still on the Come Up (featuring Hi Power Soldiers) 4:34
Mr. Clean 4:55
Let Me Luv You Girl 4:31
Gun on My Lap 3:24
Last Call 3:59
Dedicated Outro 2:03

Disc 2
Oldies Intro 2:14
I Had a Choice 4:31
Ordinary Guy (featuring Joe Bataan) 4:55
Show & Tell 4:18
Reminiscing (Skit) 1:15
Things Ain't the Same 3:23
Somebody Please 3:44
Confessing a Feeling 3:57
Tell It Like It Is 4:33
Oldies Are Forever 2:29
My Cloud (featuring  Joe Bataan) 4:01
Didn't I Blow Your Mind (featuring Roll Ellison) 3:34
Do Yourself a Favor (Snapper Diss) 4:33
She's a Classic 4:51
Bonus Oldie Track 0:10
Playgirl 4:38
Oldies Outro 2:05

Trivia
The song entitled "Do Yourself a Favor" is a diss towards ex Hi-Power artist "Snapper".

Charts

Singles
"Summertime Anthem" - peaking at number 29 on the Billboard Latin Rhythm Airplay chart.
"Mr. Clean"
"Playgirl"
"Last Call"

References 

2007 albums
Mr. Capone-E albums